In the mathematical field of graph theory, a Descartes snark is an undirected graph with 210 vertices and 315 edges. It is a snark, first discovered by William Tutte in 1948 under the pseudonym Blanche Descartes.  

A Descartes snark is obtained from the Petersen graph by replacing each vertex with a nonagon and each edge with a particular graph closely related to the Petersen graph.  Because there are multiple ways to perform this procedure, there are multiple Descartes snarks.

References

Graph families